Panagiotis Kontaxakis (born 16 August 1964 in Melbourne, Australia) is a Greek qigong and tai chi master  and a retired high jumper.

High jumper career

He finished eighth at the 1989 European Indoor Championships.

His personal best jump was 2.28 metres, achieved in July 1988 in Ankara and was repeated in May 1989 in Budapest. Thus he held the Greek national record, until 1992 when it was equaled by Kosmas Michalopoulos and bettered by Labros Papakostas.

External links
 Home page (in Greek)
 IAAF athlete profile
 Universal Tao Istructor Profile from Grand Master Mantak Chia
 YMAA Qigong Instructor

References

1964 births
Living people
Greek male high jumpers
Qigong practitioners
Tai chi practitioners